Hylink Digital Solutions Co., Ltd. is an advertising agency and media company. It was founded in 1994 and has offices in countries around the world, such as South Korea (through its subsidies), the United States and the UK.

Background
Hylink Digital Solution Co., Ltd was incorporated in 1994 as part of the Advertising & Marketing Services Industry. It has 2,400 total employees through its 21 offices. Hylink annual revenue for 2019 is $1.49Bn.

Management
 Su Tong - Founder & Chief Executive Officer
 Xavier Sun - Chief Operating Officer
 James Hebbert - Managing Director
 Ying Tiun - Digital Director

References

External links
Hylink Global Website
Digital Marketing Agency

Mass media companies of China
Online companies of China
Advertising agencies of China
Advertising agencies of South Korea
Advertising agencies of the United Kingdom
Advertising agencies of the United States
Chinese companies established in 1994
Mass media companies established in 1994